Frederick George Wheatcroft (1882 – 26 November 1917) was an English professional footballer who played during the first quarter of the 20th century. During his career he played for the original Alfreton Town, Derby County, Fulham, Reading but is best remembered for his spells at Swindon Town. He scored on his only appearance for the England amateur national team.

Derby County

Frederick G. Wheatcroft was born in Alfreton, Derbyshire in 1882. He started his football career with his hometown club, the original Alfreton Town club before moving to Division One side Derby County in 1903.

The centre forward found opportunities within the first team limited mainly due to the prolific goalscoring exploits of Steve Bloomer. In 1904 he joined Swindon Town as an amateur but soon rejoined Derby County before venturing to Wiltshire again in 1905.

After a brief spell with Fulham Wheatcroft returned to County for his final spell where he clocked up 20 appearances, scoring 4 goals.

Swindon Town

Wheatcroft left Derby for Berkshire outfit Reading but soon returned to Swindon Town in 1909. It was during this spell that Freddie Wheatcroft enjoyed his longest spell and best work as a footballer. He scored 22 times in 38 appearances throughout the 1909/10 campaign.

His career was halted by the outbreak of the First World War.

The Great War

Like many other British males, Wheatcroft answered his nation's call and enlisted to fight during World War I. He was conscripted into the East Surrey Regiment as private in May 1916 and 12 months later had risen to the rank of second lieutenant. Wheatcroft was killed in action in Bourlon on 26 November 1917 while conducting a retreat during the Battle of Cambrai and is buried in Anneux Military Cemetery.

References 

1882 births
People from Alfreton
Footballers from Derbyshire
English footballers
Association football forwards
Alfreton Town F.C. players
Swindon Town F.C. players
Derby County F.C. players
Fulham F.C. players
Reading F.C. players
English Football League players
1917 deaths
British Army personnel of World War I
British military personnel killed in World War I
East Surrey Regiment officers
England amateur international footballers